Ferula persica, the Persian asafoetida, is a species of flowering plant in the family Apiaceae, native to the Caucasus and Iran. It contains a number of matrix metalloproteinase inhibitors.

References

persica
Flora of the Transcaucasus
Flora of Iran
Plants described in 1798